Mathew Thomas  (born 16 October 2002) is an Indian actor who appears in Malayalam films. He is known for portraying Franky in his debut movie Kumbalangi Nights, Jaison in Thanneer Mathan Dinangal and Jomon in Jo and Jo.

Career
He won a role in Kumbalangi Nights (2019) through an audition held in his school. The story is about four orphaned siblings, among them, Franky is a high-school student who keeps their home up and running, as the other three are happy-go-lucky. He lodged six months on location, undergoing several training sessions, such as swimming, football, casting a fishnet, rowing boat among others. The film was a critical and commercial success. It was followed by the lead role in Thanneer Mathan Dinangal (2019), a teenage romance film about a high-school student, Jaison. It received highly positive reviews from both critics and audience. He appeared in a cameo role as young Benjamin Louis in the crime thriller Anjaam Pathiraa (2020), which  became a Box office hit. He also acted a brief role in cyber crime thriller movie Operation Java. Then he played a supporting character in Mammootty starrer One, where his performance was well praised by critics and audience. He will be making his Tamil debut in the film called Leo.

Filmography

Awards
 2020 – Asianet Film Awards for Best Star Pair of the Year – Thanneer Mathan Dinangal (shared with Anaswara Rajan)
 2020 – Vanitha Film Awards for Best Newcomer Actor of the Year – Thanneer Mathan Dinangal and Kumbalangi Nights

References

External links 
 

Male actors from Kerala
Living people
2002 births
Indian actors
21st-century Indian male actors
Indian male film actors
Male actors in Malayalam cinema